Dalmine is a comune (municipality) in the Province of Bergamo in the Italian region of Lombardy, located about  northeast of Milan and about  southwest of Bergamo.

The municipality of Dalmine contains the frazioni (subdivisions, mainly villages and hamlets) Sforzatica S. Maria d'Oleno, Sforzatica S. Andrea, Mariano al Brembo, Brembo, Guzzanica, and Sabbio.

Dalmine borders the following municipalities: Bonate Sotto, Filago, Lallio, Levate, Osio Sopra, Stezzano, Treviolo.

Demographic evolution

Transportation

References

External links
 www.comune.dalmine.bg.it/